Colombo Airport may refer to:
 Bandaranaike International Airport, the main international airport serving Sri Lanka
 Colombo International Airport, Ratmalana, the secondary international airport serving the city of Colombo, Sri Lanka